Rosine Siewe Yamaleu (born 25 November 1991) is a Cameroonian women's international footballer who plays as a defender. She is a member of the Cameroon women's national football team. She was part of the team at the 2010 and 2012 editions of the African Women's Championship. She made one appearance in the 2010 tournament against Ghana as an 85th minute substitute for Jeannette Yango. On club level she played for Franck Rohliceck S.A in Cameroon.

References

1991 births
Living people
Cameroonian women's footballers
Cameroon women's international footballers
Place of birth missing (living people)
Women's association football defenders
21st-century Cameroonian women
20th-century Cameroonian women